The 12-metre class was a sailing event on the Sailing at the 1920 Summer Olympics program in Ostend. Two type of 12 Metre classes were used. Four races were scheduled in each type. In total 18 sailors, on 2 boats, from 1 nation entered in the 12 Metre.

Race schedule

Course area

Weather conditions

Final results 
The 1920 Olympic scoring system was used. All competitors were male.

12 Metre International Rule 1907

12 Metre International Rule 1919

Notes 
 Since the official documentation of the 1920 Summer Olympics was written in 1957 many facts did disappear in time.
 Two type of 12 Metre classes were used. Those measured under the International Rule 1907 and one under the International Rule 1919.

Other information

Sailors
During the Sailing regattas at the 1920 Summer Olympics the following persons were competing:

Podium (1907 Rule)

Further reading

References 

12 Metre
12-metre class